Satiate is the debut album released by Avail in 1992. Satiate was originally released on the band's own Catheter-Assembly Records, then re-released on Old Glory Records later that year. In 1994, Lookout! Records issued the album on CD with two additional tracks, taken from Avail's 7" release Attempt to Regress.

Track listing

The song "Mr. Morgan" is named after an elderly Richmond resident who was beaten to death for a few dollars.

References

1992 debut albums
Avail albums